Ricardo Martins Guimarães (born 14 November 1995), commonly known as Guima, is a Portuguese professional footballer who plays as a midfielder for G.D. Chaves.

Club career
Born in Aveiro, Guima spent his first five seasons as a senior in the LigaPro, starting out at U.D. Oliveirense. He played his first match in the competition on 27 August 2014, coming on as a late substitute in a 0–1 home loss against S.L. Benfica B.

Guima signed with Sporting CP on 2 July 2016, being assigned to the reserve team. One year later, he joined Académica de Coimbra of the same league on loan. He scored his first goal in the second division on 11 February 2018 in a 4–0 away victory over Gil Vicente FC, being sent off against his former club Oliveirense the following month.

On 27 May 2019, Guima agreed to a three-year contract at ŁKS Łódź. His first game in the Polish Ekstraklasa took place on 3 August, when he played the second half of the 1–2 home defeat to Lech Poznań.

Guima returned to Académica and the Portuguese second tier on 7 September 2020, in a season-long loan.

References

External links

Portuguese League profile 

1995 births
Living people
People from Aveiro, Portugal
Sportspeople from Aveiro District
Portuguese footballers
Association football midfielders
Primeira Liga players
Liga Portugal 2 players
U.D. Oliveirense players
Sporting CP B players
Associação Académica de Coimbra – O.A.F. players
G.D. Chaves players
Ekstraklasa players
ŁKS Łódź players
Portuguese expatriate footballers
Expatriate footballers in Poland
Portuguese expatriate sportspeople in Poland